HMS Rover was an 18-gun iron screw corvette built for the Royal Navy in the 1870s, the sole ship of her class. The ship was initially assigned to the North America and West Indies Station until she returned home in 1879. She was transferred to the Training Squadron when it formed in 1885. Rover was not really suitable for such a role and she was placed in reserve four years later and then sold for scrap in 1893.

Design and construction
Rover was designed in 1872 by Edward Reed, the Chief Constructor of the Navy, as an improved version of the s. She displaced  tons, nearly  larger than the older ships. Her iron hull was covered by a  layer of oak that was sheathed with zinc from the waterline down to prevent biofouling. Watertight transverse bulkheads subdivided the hull. Her crew consisted of 315 officers and ratings.

The ship had one three-cylinder horizontal compound-expansion steam engine made by Ravenhill, Eastons & Co., driving a single  propeller.

The ship was an indifferent sailor and her best speed under sail alone was only . Ballard believes that one cause of her poor performance under sail was due to the drag of her uneven fore-and-aft trim. Her propeller could be hoisted up into the stern of the ship to reduce drag while under sail.

The ship was initially armed with a mix of 7-inch and 64-pounder 64 cwt rifled muzzle-loading guns. All sixteen 64-pounders were mounted on the broadside while the two  guns were mounted underneath the forecastle and poop deck as chase guns. In 1880, the ship was rearmed with 14 BL 6-inch 80-pounder breech-loading guns. One gun each was mounted at the bow and stern as chase guns while the remainder were broadside guns. Two carriages for  torpedoes were added as well.

Rover was laid down at the yards of the Thames Ironworks and Shipbuilding Company at Leamouth, London in 1872. She was launched on 12 August 1874 and completed on 21 September 1875 at a total cost of £169,739. Her hull cost £104,718 and her machinery £65,021.

Career
The ship was initially assigned to the North America and West Indies Station, and was slightly damaged by grounding on one occasion. Rover returned home in 1879 to refit at Chatham Dockyard in 1879. She was placed into reserve after the completion of her refit until she was assigned to the Training Squadron upon its formation in 1885. Rover was less than ideal for this role because of her poor performance under sail alone and she was paid off in 1889 and sold for scrap in 1893. Among the men who had served aboard her was the Antarctic explorer Robert Falcon Scott, who spent nine months aboard Rover starting in late 1886.

Notes

Footnotes

Bibliography

 
 
 
 

Corvettes of the Royal Navy
Victorian-era corvettes of the United Kingdom
1874 ships
Ships built in Leamouth